is a common masculine Japanese given name.

Possible writings
Tatsuya can be written using different kanji characters and can mean:
達也, "master/accomplished, to be"
達矢, "master/accomplished, arrow"
竜也, "dragon, to be"
竜哉, "dragon, how"
竜弥, "dragon, all the more"
辰也, "sign of the dragon, to be"
龍也, "dragon, to be"
The name can also be written in hiragana or katakana.

People with the name
, Japanese footballer
Tatsuya Egawa (達也, born 1961), Japanese manga artist
, Japanese manga artist
Tatsuya Enomoto (達也, born 1979), Japanese footballer
Tatsuya Fuji (born 1941), Japanese film actor
Tatsuya Fujiwara (竜也, born 1982), Japanese actor
, Japanese boxer
, Japanese volleyball player
 Tatsuya Futakami, Japanese shogi player
Tatsuya Furuhashi (born 1980), Japanese football player
Tatsuya Hiruta (達也), Japanese manga artist
Tatsuya Hori (born 1935), Japanese politician
Tatsuya Isaka (達也, born 1985), Japanese actor
Tatsuya Ishida, a comic artist
Tatsuya Ishihara (立也, born 1966), Japanese anime director
Tatsuya Ishii (竜也, born 1959), Japanese singer, songwriter, artist
Tatsuya Ishikawa (竜也, born 1979), Japanese football player
Tatsuya Ito (born 1961), Minister of State for Financial Services in Japanese Prime Minister Junichiro Koizumi's Cabinet
, Japanese composer
, Japanese journalist
 Tatsuya Kawajiri (達也, born 1978), Japanese mixed martial arts fighter
, Japanese film producer, critic and music producer
Tatsuya Kinugasa (born 1974), Japanese Olympic medley swimmer
Tatsuya Kurama (1952–1995), sumo wrestler
Tatsuya Masushima (born 1985), Japanese footballer
, Japanese actor
Tatsuya Mizuno (born 1981), Japanese professional mixed martial artist
Tatsuya Mochizuki (達也, born 1963), Japanese football player
Tatsuya Mori, Japanese documentary filmmaker
Tatsuya Nagatomo (達也, born 1953), Japanese actor and voice actor
Tatsuya Nakadai (達矢, born 1932), Japanese actor
, Japanese musician
, Japanese actor
Tatsuya Oe, a Japanese electronic music producer, club DJ
, Japanese footballer
Tatsuya Sakai (marksman), Japanese sport shooter
Tatsuya Sakuma (達也, born 1974), Japanese professional drifting driver
 Tatsuya Sanmaidō, Japanese shogi player
, Japanese baseball player
Tatsuya Shiokawa (born 1983), Japanese baseball player
Tatsuya Shinhama (born 1996), Japanese speed skater
 Tatsuya Sugai, Japanese shogi player
Tatsuya Suzuki (disambiguation), multiple people
, Japanese jazz saxophonist
, Japanese screenwriter for anime
Tatsuya Tanaka (disambiguation), multiple people
Tatsuya Tanimoto (龍哉, born 1966), Japanese politician
, Japanese figure skater
Tatsuya Tsuruta (born 1982), Japanese footballer
, Japanese footballer
Tatsuya Ueda (竜也), a Japanese idol, singer-songwriter and radio host
Tatsuya Uemura (建也, born 1960), Japanese arcade game musician and programmer
, Japanese badminton player
Tatsuya Yamaguchi (disambiguation), multiple people
Tatsuya Yamashita (born 1987), Japanese footballer
Tatsuya Yazawa (born 1984), Japanese footballer
Tatsuya Yoshida (達也), Japanese musician and composer

Fictional characters
Tatsuya Uesugi (達也), the main character in Touch
Tatsuya Shima (達也), a character in Wangan Midnight
Tatsuya Suou (達哉), a main character in Persona 2
Tatsuya Himuro, a character in Kuroko's Basketball
Tatsuya Shiba, a main character in The Irregular at Magic High School
 Tatsuya Kimura, a character from Hajime no Ippo

Japanese masculine given names